Nativity! is a 2009 British Christmas musical comedy film directed by Debbie Isitt and released on 27 November 2009 and the first instalment in the Nativity film series. The film stars Martin Freeman and Ashley Jensen. In the film teacher Paul Maddens (Freeman) lies to his rival that Hollywood are coming to watch his school's Christmas nativity, but after the lie gets out of hand, he must resolve the issue fast. The film was written by its director, Debbie Isitt, but was also partially improvised.
The film premiered on 23 November 2009 in the SkyDome Arena, Coventry, England.

It was released in cinemas on 27 November 2009. The film was followed by Nativity 2: Danger in the Manger (2012), Nativity 3: Dude, Where's My Donkey? (2014), and Nativity Rocks! (2018).

In 2017 a stage musical adaptation premiered and has since toured the UK over the subsequent Christmas seasons.

Plot
Mr Paul Maddens is a miserable, jaded teacher at St Bernadette's, a local state-funded Catholic primary school in Coventry. He once had ambitions of being successful as an actor, producer or director in musical theatre, but gave it up after negative reviews in the press. Paul grew to hate Christmas after his girlfriend at drama school, Jennifer Lore, broke up with him at Christmas time.

Every year, St Bernadette's competes with Oakmoor, the local posh Protestant private school, to see who can produce the best nativity play. The headteacher at St Bernadette's, Mrs Bevan, tasks Paul with running their nativity this year and assigns him a new classroom assistant named Mr Poppy, who is actually Mrs Bevan's extremely childish, immature nephew searching for work.

While out shopping with Mr Poppy for a new school Christmas tree, Paul bumps into his old rival from drama school, Gordon Shakespeare, who runs the nativity plays at Oakmoor. Desperate not to be seen as a failure, Paul lies to Gordon about how a supposed Hollywood producer, Jennifer, will be turning his production into a Hollywood film (although in reality, he hasn't spoken to her in five years). Mr Poppy overhears this and gets so excited that he spreads the story to the press. Paul finds his lie spiraling out of control, and all he can do is go along with it as media attention mounts and the children get very excited.

The children at St Bernadette's are nowhere near as talented as the Oakmoor students, and Paul has little confidence in their abilities. The enthusiastic Mr Poppy helps him and the class to create an energetic, interesting nativity which showcases all of the children's unique (and often strange) talents.

Paul tries to contact Jennifer to make the lie come true, even getting on a flight to America to persuade her to visit in-person. It turns out she is only the secretary to a film producer, and he returns home disappointed.

Amid continuing media attention and the Mayor's kind offer to allow the play to be performed in the historical ruins of Coventry Cathedral, Mrs Bevan discovers that the Hollywood story was a lie and cancels the play, advising Paul to start looking for another job and firing Mr Poppy in the process. This causes Paul to snap at Mr Poppy about everything going wrong, but when facing his disappointed class, he decides that the show must go on.

The play is performed at the cathedral to an audience of the children's parents and family friends. The children, initially anxious but motivated and encouraged by Mr Poppy's childlike spirit and optimism, actually put on a decent performance, to the surprise of everyone involved. Halfway through, Gordon climbs on stage to tell everybody that there is nobody from Hollywood there and the entire story was a lie. Luckily, a helicopter flies over and Mr Poppy declares that it's Hollywood arriving; the show continues, and Jennifer and her producer indeed appear at the back to watch. Paul joins them and, still in love, kisses Jennifer. The play ends with everyone, including Gordon and Mrs Bevan, who have a change of heart after seeing the children's talents, united onstage to celebrate the children's success.

As the film closes, Paul and Jennifer are shown decorating his house together for Christmas, reunited at last.

Cast
Martin Freeman as Paul Maddens, a primary school teacher trying to produce and direct a nativity play that will for once outdo a rival school
Marc Wootton as Desmond Poppy, the immature nephew of Mrs Bevan, whom she appoints as a classroom assistant
Jason Watkins as Gordon Shakespeare, a private primary school teacher and long-time rival of Paul
Ashley Jensen as Jennifer Lore, formerly a Hollywood secretary and Paul's girlfriend at the end of the film
Alan Carr as Patrick Burns, critic
Ricky Tomlinson as The Mayor
John Sessions as Mr Lore
Phyllis Logan as Mrs Lore
Pam Ferris as Mrs Patricia Bevan, the headmistress of St. Bernadette's Primary School
Clarke Peters as Mr Parker, a Hollywood director, Jennifer's boss during her time at Hollywood
Geoffrey Hutchings as Father Tom
Rosie Cavaliero as Miss Rye
Selina Cadell as Oakmoor Headmistress
Ashley Blake as himself

Production
The film was first announced in August 2008, when it was announced Martin Freeman would star. Principal photography began in the same month.

Box office
When released in the United Kingdom, the movie opened at #5, taking £794,315 at the box office in the United Kingdom. In its third week, the movie rose to #4, and in the end, made £5,187,402.

Sequels
 Nativity 2: Danger in the Manger
 Nativity 3: Dude, Where's My Donkey?
 ''Nativity 4: Nativity Rocks!

Stage musical
 A stage musical adaptation of the film written and directed by Debbie Isitt and composed by Nicky Ager opened at the Birmingham Repertory Theatre in October 2017. Since its world premiere the musical has toured the UK over the Christmas seasons, including runs at London's Hammersmith Apollo which have featured guest star celebrities such as Louis Walsh, Danny Dyer, Dani Dyer, Jo Brand, Rylan Clark-Neal and Sharon Osbourne.

See also
 List of Christmas films

References

External links

2009 films
BBC Film films
British Christmas comedy films
Films set in schools
Films set in Coventry
Films shot in England
Films shot in Los Angeles
Films shot in the United States
2000s Christmas comedy films
2009 comedy films
2000s English-language films
2000s British films